The Union between Sweden and Norway is an overriding theme of the history of Sweden in the 19th century. On 4 November 1814, the kingdoms of Sweden and Norway formed a personal union under one king. The two countries had completely separate institutions, except for the foreign service led by the king through the Swedish foreign minister.

The Union was seen by Sweden as the realization of an idea that had been nursed for centuries, albeit one that had been strengthened by the recent loss of Finland. When it was finally accomplished, it was due to political circumstances beyond the borders of Scandinavia. The Napoleonic wars caused Finland to be separated from Sweden, and provided the chance to compensate for the loss by wresting Norway from the united kingdoms of Denmark-Norway. Sweden actively exploited the opportunity, while Norway reluctantly resigned itself to submitting to another inevitable union. That initial disparity in attitudes towards the Union caused recurring political conflicts, and their different interpretations of the union eventually brought them apart. It was dissolved peacefully in 1905.

The last Vasa King
Gustav IV Adolf (1778–1837) ascended to the throne of Sweden in 1792, after the assassination of his father, king Gustav III. His reign was ill-fated and was to end abruptly. After the conclusion of the 1807 Treaty of Tilsit, Sweden was invited to join the Continental System. The king instead entered into negotiations with Britain in order to prepare a joint attack against Denmark–Norway, with the intention of acquiring Norway. In the meantime, the preemptive British attack on the Danish navy, the Battle of Copenhagen (1807), had forced Denmark-Norway into an alliance with France. As Sweden in the meantime had sided with the British, Denmark-Norway was forced by Napoleon to declare war on Sweden on 29 February 1808. Sweden now faced a two-front war, as Russia had invaded Finland on 21 February.

Viewing the possibility of a joint Danish and French attack as the greater danger, king Gustav IV concentrated his army in southern Sweden and staged an invasion of Norway. The Norwegian army, commanded by the general Christian August of Augustenborg, viceroy of Norway, repulsed the invaders. He refrained from pursuing the Swedish army beyond the border, while Sweden was hard pressed by the Russians in Finland, contrary to urgent requests from king Frederick VI. By the fall of 1808, the Russians had occupied all of Finland, and in the spring of 1809 were preparing to attack mainland Sweden.

On 7 March 1809, when it was clear that Sweden would lose the war with Russia, officers who were resentful at the conduct of the war staged a coup d'état and deposed the king. He was forced to abdicate on 29 March and was imprisoned with his family in Gripsholm castle. On 5 June the duke regent (Gustav's uncle) Charles XIII was proclaimed king after accepting a new liberal constitution, which was ratified by the Riksdag the next day. In December Gustav and his family were transported to Germany.

A new dynasty

Charles XIII was both infirm and childless. To secure the succession to the throne, he adopted Prince Christian August of Augustenborg as his heir. Christian August had been viceroy of Norway and commander-in-chief of the Norwegian army during its successful resistance to the Swedish invasion in 1808–09. His great popularity in Norway was considered an advantage to the Swedish plans for the acquisition of that country. In addition, he had demonstrated his interest in a rapprochement between the two countries by refraining from invading Sweden during the war with Russia. As crown prince of Sweden, he changed his name to Carl August of Augustenborg. After his mysterious death on 28 May 1810, the French marshal Bernadotte (later to become Charles XIV John) was adopted by Charles XIII and received the homage of the estates on 5 November 1810.

The new crown prince was very soon the most popular and the most powerful man in Sweden. The infirmity of the old king and the dissensions in the Privy Council, placed the government and especially the control of foreign affairs almost entirely in his hands. He boldly adopted a policy which was antagonistic to the wishes and hopes of the old school of Swedish statesmen, but perhaps the best adapted to the circumstances. He gave up Finland for lost, knowing that Russia would never voluntarily relinquish it, and that Sweden could not hope to retain it permanently, even if she reconquered it. The acquisition of Norway, however, might make up for the loss of Finland. Bernadotte, now crown prince Charles John or "Karl Johan", planned to acquire Norway by joining the enemies of Napoleon, whose only loyal ally was Denmark-Norway.

At first, however, he was obliged to submit to the emperor's dictates. Thus on 13 November 1810 the Swedish government was forced to declare war against Great Britain, although the British government under Spencer Perceval was privately informed at the same time that Sweden was not a free agent and that the war would be a mere demonstration. But the pressure of Napoleon became more and more intolerable, culminating in the occupation of Swedish Pomerania by French troops in 1812. The Swedish government thereupon concluded a secret convention with Russia, the Treaty of Saint Petersburg of 5 April 1812, undertaking to send 30,000 men to operate against Napoleon in Germany in return for a promise from Alexander I of Russia guaranteeing Sweden the possession of Norway. Napoleon belatedly endeavored to outbid Alexander by offering Sweden to regain Finland and take over all of Pomerania (including Farther Pomerania) and Mecklenburg, in return for Sweden's active cooperation against Russia.

The Örebro Riksdag (April–August, 1812), remarkable for its partial repudiation of Sweden's national debt and its reactionary press laws, introduced general conscription in Sweden, thereby enabling the crown prince to carry out his ambitious policy. In May 1812 he mediated a peace between Russia and the Ottoman Empire so as to enable Russia to use all her forces against France (the Treaty of Bucharest); and on 18 July, at Örebro, peace was also concluded between the United Kingdom on one side and Russia and Sweden on the other.

These two treaties were, in effect, the cornerstones of a fresh coalition against Napoleon, and were confirmed on the outbreak of the Franco-Russian War by a conference between Alexander and Charles John at Turku on 30 August 1812, when the Tsar undertook to place an army corps of 35,000 men at the disposal of the Swedish crown prince for the conquest of Norway.

Personal union with Norway

The Treaty of Åbo, and indeed the whole of Charles John's foreign policy in 1812, provoked violent and justifiable criticism among the better class of politicians in Sweden. The immorality of indemnifying Sweden at the expense of a weaker friendly power was obvious; and, while Finland was now definitively sacrificed, Norway had still to be won.

Moreover, the United Kingdom and Russia insisted that Charles John's first duty was to the anti-Napoleonic coalition, the former power vigorously objecting to the expenditure of her subsidies on the nefarious Norwegian adventure before the common enemy had been crushed. Only on his very ungracious compliance did the United Kingdom also promise to countenance the union of Norway and Sweden (Treaty of Stockholm, 3 March 1813), and on 23 April, Russia gave her guarantee to the same effect.

The Swedish crown prince rendered several important services to the allies during the campaign of 1813 but after the Battle of Leipzig (1813) went his own way, determined to cripple Denmark and secure Norway at all costs.

On 7 January 1814, about to be overrun by Swedish, Russian, and German troops under the command of the elected crown prince of Sweden, king Frederick VI of Denmark agreed to cede Norway to the king of Sweden in order to avoid an occupation of Jutland.
These terms were formalized and signed at the Treaty of Kiel on 14 January, in which Denmark negotiated to maintain sovereignty over the Norwegian possessions of Greenland, the Faroe Islands, and Iceland.

The Norwegians themselves were opposed to this treaty that they had not been party to. Already in Norway, the viceroy, Hereditary Prince Christian Frederik resolved to preserve the integrity of the country, and if possible the union with Denmark, by taking the lead in a Norwegian insurrection. In Norway, the sentiment was that the country had been "sold out" to Sweden, their sworn arch-enemy.

Christian Frederik proclaimed himself regent of Norway and called a constitutional convention at Eidsvoll. On 17 May 1814 the Constitution of Norway was adopted, and Christian Frederik was unanimously elected king of Norway. But his efforts so seek support for Norwegian independence from the great powers were in vain, as they were bound by their promises to Sweden. When crown prince Charles John returned from the final battles against France, he launched an attack on the outnumbered Norwegian army on 29 July. The first hostilities were short and ended with decisive victories for Sweden. On 7 August a Swedish delegation arrived at the Norwegian military headquarters with a cease-fire offer that would join Norway in a union with Sweden and respect the Norwegian constitution. Peace negotiations with Swedish envoys began in the town of Moss on 10 August and were concluded on 14 August. The Convention of Moss resulted in a general cease-fire based on terms that effectively were terms of peace. Christian Frederik succeeded in excluding from the text any indication that Norway had recognized the Treaty of Kiel, and Sweden accepted that it was not to be considered a premise of the future union between the two states. Understanding the advantage of avoiding a costly war and of letting Norway enter into a union voluntarily instead of being annexed as a conquered territory, Charles John offered favorable peace terms. He promised to recognize the Norwegian Constitution, with only those amendments that were necessary for a union of the two countries. Christian Frederik agreed to call an extraordinary session of the Norwegian Parliament in September or October. He would then transfer his executive powers to the elected representatives of the people, who would negotiate the terms of the union with Sweden, and finally relinquish all claims to the Norwegian throne and leave the country. On 4 November 1814 the Storting revised the Constitution and elected Charles XIII of Sweden as the new king of Norway.

Act of Union

The lack of a common constitutional foundation for the Union with Norway was felt strongly by crown prince Charles John during its first year. The fundamental documents were only the Convention of Moss and the revised Norwegian Constitution of 4 November 1814. But the conservative Swedish Riksdag had not allowed the Swedish constitution to be revised. Therefore, a bilateral treaty had to be negotiated in order to clarify procedures for treating constitutional questions that had to be decided jointly by both governments. The Act of Union (Riksakten) was negotiated during the spring of 1815. The treaty contained twelve articles dealing with the king's authority, the relationship between the two legislatures, how the executive power was to be exercised if the king should die before the crown prince had attained majority, and the relationship between the cabinets. It also confirmed the practice of treating questions of foreign policy in the Swedish cabinet, with the Norwegian prime minister present. Vital questions pertaining to the Union were to be treated in a joint cabinet meeting, where all the Norwegian ministers residing in Stockholm would be present. The Act was passed by the Storting 31 July 1815 and by the Riksdag 6 August, and sanctioned by the king on 15 August. In Sweden the Act of Union was a set of provisions under regular law, but the Norwegian Storting gave it constitutional status, so that its provisions could only be revised according to the procedures laid down in the constitution.

The royal house of Bernadotte

Charles XIII of Sweden died on 5 February 1818, and was succeeded by Bernadotte under the title of Charles XIV John. The new king devoted himself to the promotion of the material development of the country, with the Göta Canal absorbing the greater portion of the twenty-four million the Riksdaler voted for the purpose. The external debt of Sweden was gradually extinguished, the internal debt considerably reduced, and the budget showed an average annual surplus of 700,000 Riksdaler. With returning prosperity the necessity for internal reform became urgent in Sweden.

The popularity of Charles XIV decreased for a time in the 1830s, culminating in the Rabulist riots in 1838 after the Lèse-majesté conviction of the journalist Magnus Jacob Crusenstolpe, and some calls for his abdication.

The antiquated Riksdag of the Estates, where the privileged estates predominated, while the cultivated bourgeoisie was practically unrepresented, had become an insuperable obstacle to all free development; but though the Riksdag of 1840 itself raised the question of reform, the king and the aristocracy refused to entertain it. Yet the reign of Charles XIV was, on the whole, most beneficial to Sweden; and if there was much just cause for complaint, his great services to his adopted country were generally acknowledged. Abroad he maintained a policy of peace based mainly on a good understanding with Russia.

Oscar I

Charles XIV John's son and successor King Oscar I was much more liberally inclined. Shortly after his accession on 4 March 1844, he laid several projects of reform before the Riksdag, many of which had been prepared by the liberal jurist Johan Gabriel Richert. However, the estates would do little more than abolish the obsolete marriage and inheritance laws and a few commercial monopolies. As the financial situation necessitated a large increase of taxation, there was much popular discontent, which culminated in riots in the streets of Stockholm March 1848. Yet, when fresh proposals for parliamentary reform were laid before the Riksdag in 1849, they were again rejected by three out of the four estates.

As regards to foreign policy, Oscar I was strongly anti-German. At the outbreak of the First Dano-Prussian War of 1848–1849, Sweden greatly sympathized with Denmark. Hundreds of Swedish volunteers hastened to defend Schleswig-Holstein. The Riksdag voted 2,000,000 Riksdaler for additional armaments. It was Sweden, too, which mediated the Truce of Malmö on 26 August 1848, which helped Denmark out of her difficulties. During the Crimean War Sweden remained neutral, although public opinion was decidedly anti-Russian, and sundry politicians regarded the conjuncture as favorable for regaining Finland.

Charles XV

Oscar I was succeeded on 8 July 1859, by his eldest son, Charles XV, who had already acted as regent during his father's illnesses. He succeeded, with the invaluable assistance of the minister of justice, Baron Louis De Geer, in at last accomplishing the much-needed reform of the constitution. The way had been prepared in 1860 by a sweeping measure of municipal reform; and, in January 1863, the government brought in a reform bill by the terms of which the Riksdag was henceforth to consist of two chambers, the Upper House being a sort of aristocratic senate, while the members of the Lower House were to be elected triennially by popular suffrage.

The new constitution was accepted by all four estates in 1865 and promulgated on 22 January 1866. On 1 September 1866, the first elections under the new system were held, and on 19 January 1867 the new Riksdag met for the first time. With this one great reform Charles XV had to be content; in all other directions he was hampered, more or less, by his own creation. The Riksdag refused to sanction his favorite project, that of a reform of the Swedish army on the Prussian model, for which he labored all his life, partly from motives of economy, partly from an apprehension of the king's martial tendencies.

In 1864 Charles XV had endeavored to form an anti-Prussian league with Denmark to contain Prussia; after the defeat of Denmark, he projected a Scandinavian Union, in order, with the help of France, to oppose Prussian predominance in the north - a policy which naturally collapsed with the overthrow of the French Empire in 1870. He died on 18 September 1872, and was succeeded by his younger brother, the duke of Östergötland, who reigned as Oscar II.

State of the Union

The relations with Norway during the reign of King Oscar II had great influence on political life in Sweden, and more than once it seemed as if the union between the two countries was on the point of being wrecked. The dissensions chiefly had their origin in the demand by Norway for separate consuls and eventually a separate foreign service. Norway had, according to the constitution of 1814, the right to separate consular offices, but had not exercised that right partly for financial reasons, partly because the consuls appointed by the Swedish foreign office generally did a satisfactory job of representing Norway.

At last, after vain negotiations and discussions, the Swedish government in 1895 gave notice to Norway that the commercial treaty which until then had existed between the two countries would lapse in July 1897 and would cease according to a decision in the Riksdag, and as Norway at the time had raised the customs duties, a considerable diminution in the exports of Sweden to Norway took place. Count Lewenhaupt, the Swedish minister of foreign affairs, who was considered to be too friendly towards the Norwegians, resigned and was replaced by Count Ludvig Douglas, who represented the opinion of the majority in the First Chamber. However, when the Norwegian Storting, for the third time, passed a bill for a national or "pure" flag, which King Oscar eventually sanctioned, Count Douglas resigned in his turn and was succeeded by the Swedish minister at Berlin, Lagerheim, who managed to pilot the questions of the union into more quiet waters.

Lagerheim gained more success in his endeavors, as the new elections to the Riksdag of 1900 showed clearly that the Swedish people were not inclined to follow the ultraconservative or so-called "patriotic" party, which resulted in the resignation of the two leaders of that party, Professor Oscar Alin and Count Marshal Patrick Reutersvärd as members of the First Chamber. On the other hand, ex-Professor E. Carlson, of the Gothenburg University, succeeded in forming a party of Liberals and Radicals to the number of about 90 members, who besides being in favor of the extension of the franchise, advocated the full equality of Norway with Sweden in the management of foreign affairs.

The state of quietude which for some time prevailed with regard to the relations with Norway was not to last. The question of separate consuls for Norway soon came up again. In 1902 the Swedish government proposed that negotiations in this matter should be opened with the Norwegian government, and that a joint committee, consisting of representatives from both countries, should be appointed to consider the question of a separate consular service without in any way interfering with the existing administration of the diplomatic affairs of the two countries.

The result of the negotiations was published in a so-called "communiqué", dated 24 March 1903, in which, among other things, it was proposed that the relations of the separate consuls to the joint ministry of foreign affairs and the embassies should be arranged by identical laws, which could not be altered or repealed without the consent of the governments of both countries. The proposal for these identical laws, which the Norwegian government in May 1904 submitted, did not meet with the approval of the Swedish government. The latter in their reply proposed that the Swedish foreign minister should have such control over the Norwegian consuls as to prevent the latter from exceeding their authority.

However, the Norwegian government found this proposal unacceptable, and explained that, if such control were insisted upon, all further negotiations would be purposeless. They maintained that the Swedish demands were incompatible with the sovereignty of Norway, as the foreign minister was a Swede and the proposed Norwegian consular service, as a Norwegian institution, could not be placed under a foreign authority. A new proposal by the Swedish government was likewise rejected, and in February 1905 the Norwegians broke off the negotiations. Notwithstanding this an agreement did not appear to be out of the question. All efforts to solve the consular question by itself had failed, but it was considered that an attempt might be made to establish separate consuls in combination with a joint administration of diplomatic affairs on a full unionistic basis.

Crown Prince Gustaf, who during the illness of King Oscar II was appointed regent, took the initiative of renewing the negotiations between the two countries, and on 5 April in a combined Swedish and Norwegian Council of State made a proposal for a reform both of the administration of diplomatic affairs and of the consular service on the basis of full equality between the two kingdoms, with the express reservation, however, of a joint foreign minister – Swedish or Norwegian – as a condition for the existence of the union. This proposal was approved of by the Swedish Riksdag on 3 May 1905. In order that no obstacles should be placed in the way for renewed negotiations, Erik Gustaf Boström, the Prime Minister, resigned and was succeeded by Johan Ramstedt. The proposed negotiations were not, however, renewed.

Dissolution of the Union

On 23 May 1905, the Norwegian Storting passed the government's proposal for the establishment of separate Norwegian consuls, and as King Oscar II, who again had resumed the reins of government, made use of his constitutional right to veto the bill, the Norwegian ministry tendered their resignation. The king, however, declared he could not now accept their resignation, whereupon the ministry at a sitting of the Norwegian Storting on 7 June placed their resignation in its hands. The Storting thereupon unanimously adopted a resolution stating that, as the king had declared himself unable to form a government, the constitutional royal power "ceased to be operative", whereupon the ministers were requested, until further instructions, to exercise the power vested in the king, and as King Oscar thus had ceased to act as "the king of Norway", the union with Sweden was in consequence dissolved.

In Sweden, where they were least of all prepared for the turn things had taken, the action of the Storting created the greatest surprise and resentment. The king solemnly protested against what had taken place and summoned an extraordinary session of the Riksdag for 20 June to consider what measures should be taken, with regard to the question of the union, which had arisen suddenly through the "revolt" of the Norwegians on 7 June.

The Riksdag declared that it was not opposed to negotiations being entered upon regarding the conditions for the dissolution of the union if the Norwegian Storting, after a new election, made a proposal for the repeal of the Act of Union between the two countries, or if a proposal to this effect was made by Norway after the Norwegian people, through a plebiscite, had declared themselves in favor of the dissolution of the union. The Riksdag further resolved that 100 million kronor should be held in readiness and be available, as the Riksdag might decide for war. On the resignation of the Ramstedt ministry, Lundeberg formed a coalition ministry consisting of members of the various parties in the Riksdag, after which the Riksdag was prorogued on 3 August.

After the plebiscite in Norway on 13 August, in which the Norwegian people had decided in favor of the dissolution of the union with 368,392 votes against 184 votes, and after the Storting had requested the Swedish government to co-operate with it for the repeal of the Act of Union, a conference of delegates from both countries was convened at Karlstad on 31 August . On 23 September the delegates came to an agreement, the principal points of which were: that such disputes between the two countries which could not be settled by direct diplomatic negotiations, and which did not affect the vital interests of either country, should be referred to the permanent court of arbitration at The Hague, that on either side of the southern frontier a neutral zone of about fifteen kilometers width should be established, and that within eight months the fortifications within the Norwegian part of the zone should be destroyed. Both sides immediately demobilized the military forces that had been prepared for an armed conflict.

Other clauses dealt with the rights of the Sami people to graze their reindeer alternatively in either country, and with the question of transport of goods across the frontier by rail or other means of communication, so that the traffic should not be hampered by any import or export, prohibitions or otherwise.

From 2 to 19 October the extraordinary Riksdag was again assembled, and eventually approved of the arrangement; delegates convened at Karlstad with regard to the amicable dissolution of the union as well as the government's proposal for the repeal of the Act of Union and the recognition of Norway as an independent state. An alteration in the Swedish flag was also decided upon, by which the Union badge was to be replaced by an azure-blue square.

An offer from the Norwegian Storting to elect a prince of the Swedish royal house as king in Norway was declined by King Oscar II, who now on behalf of himself and his successors renounced the right to the Norwegian crown. Prime minister Lundeberg, who had accepted office only to settle the question of the dissolution of the union, now resigned and was succeeded by a Liberal government with Karl Staaff as prime minister.

Both parliaments revoked the Act of Union on 16 October, and King Oscar II renounced his claim to the Norwegian throne and recognized Norway as an independent kingdom on 26 October. The Norwegian parliament offered the vacant throne to Prince Carl of Denmark, who accepted after another plebiscite had confirmed the monarchy. He arrived in Norway on 25 November 1905, taking the name Haakon VII.

See also
 Union between Sweden and Norway
 Dissolution of the union between Norway and Sweden in 1905
 Union Dissolution Day
 History of Norway
 History of Denmark
 History of Sweden
 History of Scandinavia
 Union badge of Norway and Sweden
 Kalmar Union
 Denmark-Norway
 Norway in 1814

Notes

.
Political history of Norway
Political history of Sweden
19th century in Norway
19th century in Sweden
Norway–Sweden relations